99 cents or 99¢ may refer to:

Music
 99 Cents (Chicks on Speed album), and the title song, 2003
 99¢ (Santigold album), 2016

Visual arts
 99 Cent, a 1999 color photograph by Andreas Gursky
 99 Cent II Diptychon, a 2001 color photography by Andreas Gursky

Other uses
 Psychological pricing, a theory that certain prices have a psychological impact
 99 cent store, or variety store
 99 Cents Only Store, an American price-point retailer

See also
 
 
 
 99% (disambiguation)
 99p (disambiguation)
 0.99 (disambiguation)